The Summer EP is an EP by Never Shout Never. Originally, this release was supposed to be the band's debut self-titled full-length album. This is the first release from Never Shout Never where his name no longer appears as one word with an exclamation point at the end. The EP peaked at number 57 on the Billboard 200 albums chart on a charting date of July 11, 2009 and selling 46,000 copies.

Track list

Personnel
Never Shout Never
 Christofer Drew Ingle – Lead vocals, lead & rhythm guitars, bass, ukulele, piano, keyboards, synthesizers, programming
 Hayden Benton – Drums, backing vocals, guitars

Production
 Produced, mixing, engineered, and mastered by Forrest Kline
 Recorded at Engaged Audio and The Phantom Tollbooth

Charts

References

2009 EPs
Never Shout Never albums
Warner Records EPs